Byttnerioideae is a subfamily of the flowering plant family Malvaceae.

Tribes and genera
Four tribes are recognised by the Germplasm Resources Information Network:

Byttnerieae

 Abroma Jacq.
 Ayenia L.
 Byttneria Loefl.
 Kleinhovia L.
 Leptonychia Turcz.
 Megatritheca Cristóbal
 Rayleya Cristóbal
 Scaphopetalum Mast.

Hermannieae

 Dicarpidium F.Muell.
 Gilesia F.Muell.
 Hermannia L.
 Melochia L.
 Waltheria L.

Lasiopetaleae

 Commersonia J.R.Forst. & G.Forst.
 Guichenotia J.Gay
 Hannafordia F.Muell.
 Keraudrenia J.Gay
 Lasiopetalum Sm.
 Lysiosepalum F.Muell.
 Maxwellia Baill.
 Rulingia R.Br.
 Seringia J.Gay
 Thomasia J.Gay

Theobromateae

 Glossostemon Desf.
 Guazuma Mill.
 Herrania Goudot
 Theobroma L.

References

External links
 
 

 
Rosid subfamilies